The Society for the Study of Ingestive Behavior (SSIB) is an organization committed to advancing scientific research on food and fluid intake and its associated biological, psychological and social processes. The Society provides a multidisciplinary environment for the free exchange of ideas and information, and serves as a resource for scientific expertise and education on topics related to the study of ingestive behavior.

Its approximately 600 members hail from many different nations and include psychologists, neuroscientists, psychiatrists, physiologists, nutritionists, food scientists, and many others who are interested in research on eating and drinking.  Thus, the organization is quite interdisciplinary.

SSIB's origins can be traced to the annual meeting of the Eastern Psychological Association where it was a satellite meeting.  Its first independent meeting occurred in 1992 at Princeton University and it has held an annual meeting since in various locations in the United States, Europe, and Canada.

Meetings

References

External links
 SSIB Website

Medical associations
Eating behaviors of humans